The genus Carthamus, the distaff thistles, includes plants in the family Asteraceae. The group is native to Europe, North Africa, and parts of Asia. The flower has been used since ancient times in the Philippines, which it has been called kasubha by the Tagalog people.

The best known species is the safflower (Carthamus tinctorius).

 Species

References

External links
 Jepson Manual Treatment
 
 

 
Asteraceae genera